Pobeda is a rural locality (a settlement) in Pobedenskoye Rural Settlement of Maykopsky District, Russia. The population was 922 as of 2018.

References 

Rural localities in Maykopsky District